The Discovery School is a bilingual (English/Spanish) school located in Tegucigalpa, the capital city of Honduras.

History  

The school was founded in 1993 and is managed via an elected Board  of Directors.

Discovery School is accredited by the Honduran Ministry of Education, U.S. Department of State Office of Overseas Schools and AdvancEd (SACS-CASI).

Students represent more than 18 nationalities and about 56% of students are from Honduras, 44% from the United States and other countries. There are 36 full time teachers and two full-time teaching assistants. 

In 2006, the school relocated to its new campus outside of Tegucigalpa.

Academics
Discovery School uses a U.S.-style curriculum and adopted Common Core in math and language arts. Currently, the school offers eight Advanced Placement (AP) courses and is also accredited by the College Board.

Notes

Educational institutions established in 1993
Schools in Honduras
Bilingual schools
Universities and colleges accredited by the Southern Association of Colleges and Schools
Schools in Tegucigalpa
1993 establishments in Honduras